The 2006 Wisconsin Badgers football team represented the University of Wisconsin–Madison during the 2006 NCAA Division I FBS football season.  Led by first-year head coach Bret Bielema, the Badgers completed the season with a 12–1 record, including a 7–1 mark in the Big Ten Conference, good for a second-place tie with Michigan.

The season was one of the most successful in Badgers football history.  The 11 regular-season wins and 12 overall wins were both single season records for the Badgers, and the season ended with a second straight victory in the Capital One Bowl, over Arkansas, 17-14.  The Badgers, who were not ranked in the preseason and were expected to finish in the middle of the Big Ten, surprised many with their success and ended the season ranked #7 in the AP Poll and #5 in the Coaches' Poll.

Preseason
The Badgers were picked to finish in the middle of the Big Ten conference and were not ranked in the preseason for a number of reasons.  Early defections to the National Football League by second-team All-Americans Brandon Williams and Brian Calhoun left the Badger offense with only three returning starters.  Additionally, with the departure of Barry Alvarez – who had just completed his final season with 10 wins and a Capital One Bowl victory – the head coaching job was taken over by Bret Bielema, then the youngest head coach in Division I-A football.

Bright spots for the Badgers included returning All-American offensive tackle Joe Thomas, who was coming off an ACL injury.  John Stocco resumed the starting position at quarterback for his senior season, and P. J. Hill, Jr. won the starting tailback job.  The defense was to be led by senior linebacker Mark Zalewski and senior strong safety Joe Stellmacher.  The special teams unit was considered strong, with All-American candidate Ken DeBauche punting the ball.

Some sportswriters felt that the non-conference schedule was fairly weak.  Early in the season, the team's non-conference schedule was placed on the "waiting list" of ESPN.com's Bottom 10 rankings.

Schedule

Roster

Game summaries

Bowling Green

In his debut, P. J. Hill, Jr. had 130 rushing yards and a touchdown to lead the Badgers to a victory over the hometeam Falcons.  The Badgers broke a 7–7 tie in the second quarter when a Alonso Rojas punt was blocked by Jonathan Casillas and he recovered the punt in the end zone for a touchdown.  John Stocco finished 9-of-15 for 124 yards and a touchdown, with an interception.

Western Illinois

P. J. Hill, Jr. ran for over 100 yards for the second game in a row and the Badgers overcame a rocky first quarter to beat the Leathernecks.  After a fumble on the kickoff led to a WIU field goal, the Badgers reeled off 34 straight points – 17 in the second quarter – to effectively put the game away.  John Stocco was 15–25 for 227 yards and another touchdown and Hill collected three touchdowns on the ground for the Badgers.

San Diego State

P. J. Hill, Jr. ran for 184 yards and a touchdown and the defense shut out the Aztecs in the last game before the start of conference play.  The Badgers allowed just 153 yards but the offense was out of sync for the third straight week as Stocco completed just 12 of his 23 passes for 85 yards.  Paul Hubbard registered a six-yard touchdown catch in the fourth quarter to close out the scoring.

#6 Michigan

Wisconsin performed admirably in the first half, scoring 10 points but special teams miscues led to 10 Wolverine points by the break.  P. J. Hill, Jr. was held to 54 yards against the stout Michigan run defense and Mario Manningham had 113 yards and two touchdowns through the air as Michigan raced out to 17 straight points in the second half to beat the Badgers, 27–13.  The Badgers intercepted Chad Henne three times, but it was not enough to overcome the Wolverines' powerful offense.  Wisconsin, which had beaten Michigan in 2005, had a five-game winning streak snapped.  Michigan moved to 4–0 on the season.

Indiana

The Badgers bounced back from their first loss of the season, racing out to a 52–0 lead over the hometeam Hoosiers en route to a dominating 52–17 victory.  John Stocco threw for 304 yards and had three touchdown strikes by halftime, and P. J. Hill, Jr. had 129 yards and another three touchdowns for the Badgers.  The Hoosiers were held to just 147 yards through three quarters.  Paul Hubbard caught seven passes for 122 yards and a touchdown for the Badgers.

Northwestern

For the second straight week, the Badger defense stepped up big, holding NU tailback Tyrell Sutton to just 18 yards on the ground.  Wisconsin avenged last year's loss to the Wildcats with a punishing ground game, highlighted by P. J. Hill, Jr.'s rumbling 60-yard touchdown in the first quarter.  In his best effort to date, Hill piled up 249 of the Badgers' 316 yards on the ground as the Badgers prevailed.

Minnesota

The Badgers hosted Minnesota in the battle for Paul Bunyan's Axe.  The Badgers, who had moved into the AP rankings for the first time this season, prevailed 48–12 behind John Stocco's four touchdown passes, two to Travis Beckum, who also had 118 receiving yards.  Stocco finished 12-of-19 for 193 yards.  Jack Ikegwuonu opened the scoring by returning Amir Pinnix's first-quarter fumble 50 yards for a touchdown.  P. J. Hill, Jr. racked up 164 yards and two more scores as the Badgers defended the Axe.

Purdue

The Badgers moved into the Coaches Poll for the first time, ranked #22 going into their showdown against Purdue.  The Badger defense figured to get a good test against the Boilermakers offense, which led the Big Ten at over 470 yards a game entering the contest.  Purdue managed only 299 yards and a field goal as the Badgers limited Purdue quarterback Curtis Painter to just 187 yards on 20-of-40 passing and an interception.  P. J. Hill, Jr. ran for another two touchdowns and 161 yards.

Illinois

The visiting Illini gave the #18 Badgers a scare, as Illinois quarterback Juice Williams engineered three scoring drives in the second quarter to give the Illini a 24–10 lead at halftime.  P. J. Hill, Jr. suffered a pinched nerve and left the game in the first quarter.  Backup Lance Smith scored the Badgers' only touchdown of the first half.  John Stocco threw for two touchdowns and Taylor Mehlhaff kicked two field goals in the second half, and the defense held Illinois scoreless throughout the second half to prevail victorious, 30–24.

Penn State

The Badger defense stepped up in a huge way against Penn State, yielding only a field goal and 244 yards.  Consistent pressure frustrated Nittany Lions quarterback Anthony Morelli, and the offense controlled the clock with 148 yards from P. J. Hill, Jr..  The Badgers won 13–3 to move to 9–1 on the season and their sixth straight victory.  John Stocco suffered a shoulder injury in the fourth quarter.

This game drew the ire of Penn State head coach Joe Paterno as the first half came to a close.  Under the clock rules introduced at the beginning of the season, the clock began running immediately as the ball was kicked, rather than when it was fielded by the receiving team.  Following a Stocco touchdown that gave the Badgers a 10–3 lead with 23 seconds to go, Coach Bielema deliberately ordered his kickoff unit to run offsides before Taylor Mehlhaff kicked off.  Because the Badgers were offsides (and thus further downfield), the Penn State special teams were unable to field the ball well, and thus would have had awful field position; they instead elected to rekick.  Wisconsin repeated the tactic, essentially running out the clock on the first half.  Bielema's strategy was decried by many as unsportsmanlike; others praised him for bringing light to a loophole in the new clock system.  After the regular season, the clock rules were reverted to their pre-2006 form.

Iowa

After moving up to #16 in the coaches poll, Wisconsin ended a two-game losing streak to the Hawkeyes with a 24–21 victory in Iowa City.  With John Stocco sitting out due to injury, backup Tyler Donovan played an efficient game, going 17-of-24 for 228 yards and two touchdowns.  Hawkeyes quarterback Drew Tate threw for Iowa's three touchdowns but was frustrated all game, completing fewer than a third of his attempts.  With the win, the Badgers completed conference play with a 7–1 mark, wrapping up a second place tie in the Big Ten.

Buffalo

On Senior Day, the #10 Badgers started sluggishly, but scored two touchdowns just before halftime and added two more in the second half to win decisively over Buffalo, 35–3.  Tyler Donovan once again performed proficiently, throwing for over 300 yards and two touchdowns with an interception on 16-of-26, and the defense forced four turnovers and held Buffalo to just 159 yards.  P. J. Hill, Jr. scored a touchdown and picked up 86 yards on the ground.

With the win, the Badgers finished 11–1, the best regular season in school history.  There was a minor controversy concerning the Bowl Championship Series, whose rules state that only two teams from one conference may receive bids to BCS bowl games.  Ohio State and Michigan were ranked ahead of the Badgers in the final BCS standings, granting those two schools BCS invitations and relegating the Badgers to a lesser bowl.  Nevertheless, Wisconsin again accepted an invitation to the Capital One Bowl, where it would defend its championship against Arkansas.

Capital One Bowl – Arkansas

The Badgers returned to Orlando to face the #13 Razorbacks, led by Heisman Trophy runner-up Darren McFadden.  McFadden burst for 45 yards on his first carry but was brought down from behind by Jack Ikegwuonu at the 9-yard line, a pivotal play that led to a missed field goal by Arkansas.  The Badgers led 17–7 at halftime behind John Stocco's two touchdown passes, and eventually survived a nailbiting second half in which the Razorbacks continually had great field position but failed to capitalize.  Despite being held to -5 rushing yards while giving up 232, including 150 from Arkansas' Felix Jones, the Badgers won 17–14.  John Stocco, playing in his final collegiate game, was named the game's MVP.

The Badgers finished the season on a nine-game winning streak to reach #5 in the final coaches poll and #7 in the final AP poll.  The 12 wins were a new single season record.

Regular starters

Team players selected in the 2007 NFL Draft

References

Wisconsin
Wisconsin Badgers football seasons
Citrus Bowl champion seasons
Wisconsin Badgers football